Nine Hills One Valley is a 2021 Indian Manipuri-Tangkhul bilingual film conceptualized and directed by Haobam Paban Kumar. It is produced by Warepam Jhansirani and Haobam Paban Kumar for Oli Pictures. The movie was among 19 feature films selected for Film Bazaar Recommends (FBR) section of the Film Bazaar 2020. It was premiered at the 16th Jogja-NETPAC Asian Film Festival 2021, Indonesia.

The film was certified by Central Board of Film Certification (CBFC) in 2020.

Synopsis
The film centres around Ahum, a tribal from the hills who is going to Imphal city in the valley to meet his daughter. She is to leave for New Delhi in search of a job. During the course of the journey, he encounters different people and their stories, gradually exposing the cruelty of ethnic conflicts.

Cast
 Shang Anam Ahum
 Thanreingam Ngalung
 Lakreiphi Ahum
 Tennoson Pheiray
 Agui Kamei
 Aimol Villagers
 Kharampu
 Makhan Villagers
 Borun Thokchom
 Shananda Phurailatpam
 Chongtham Belmond
 Pao Neo Mate
 Haobam Paban Kumar
 Laishram Devakumar
 Veinen Lhungdim

Accolades
Nine Hills One Valley received Special Mention Award in the Film Bazaar Recommends Section of the Film Bazaar 2020 held in January 2021. The citation for the award reads, "A jury special mention goes to a film that aptly blurs the boundaries between fiction and documentary to embark on a journey through a landscape of many identities and conflicts. Through the journey of its protagonist and through the language of cinema, the director gives word to the unspoken and searches for a space of reconciliation. The special mention goes to Nine Hills One Valley by Haobam Paban Kumar".

The film won 2 awards at the 14th Manipur State Film Awards 2022.

Film festivals
Nine Hills One Valley has been selected for many international film festivals in India and abroad.
 16th Jogja-NETPAC Asian Film Festival 2021, Indonesia
 5th Ottawa Indian Film Festival Awards (OIFFA) 2022, Canada
  27th Kolkata International Film Festival 2022 (Asian Select Category)
 22nd Jio MAMI Mumbai Film Festival 2022 (India Gold section)
 1st International Tribal Film Festival (ITFF) 2022, Arunachal Pradesh
 1st Eikhoigi Imphal International Film Festival 2022, Manipur
 13th Indian Film Festival of Melbourne 2022
 44th Moscow International Festival 2022
 13th Annual Chicago South Asian Film Festival (CSAFF) 2022
 15th International Film Festival East & West 2022, Orenburg, Russia

References

Meitei-language films
2021 films
Cinema of Manipur